Ophidiophilia is an attraction to snakes; it is the opposite of ophidiophobia (the fear of snakes). Ophidiophilia is a subcategory of zoophilia, the sexual attraction to animals in general. People with ophidiophilia are known as ophidiophiles. Ophidiophilia doesn't always appear as sexual attraction; some ophidiophiles are attracted to snakes on a platonic (non-sexual) level.

Ophidicism (an act associated with ophidiophilia) is a sexual act in which a person inserts the tail of a snake or eel in their vagina or anus, and receives pleasure as it wriggles to get free. It can be dangerous in that some reptiles carry salmonella. Ophidicism has been documented as being practiced (as well as many other sexual acts) in Ancient Greece. Variations include inserting the snake/eel headfirst.

The snake is an ancient symbol of fertility and sexuality.

See also
 Vorarephilia

References

Zoophilia